Javier Cano (born 4 March 1973) is a Spanish rower. He competed in the men's coxed pair event at the 1992 Summer Olympics.

References

External links
 

1973 births
Living people
Spanish male rowers
Olympic rowers of Spain
Rowers at the 1992 Summer Olympics
Place of birth missing (living people)